The VR Class Sk1, originally known as the Finnish Steam Locomotive Classes G1, G2 & G4, were a series of 60 2-6-0 locomotives built for the Finnish State Railways by Swiss Locomotive & Machine Works in 1885. Two are preserved, one at (No. 124), at the Finnish Railway Museum, and the other (No. 135) at Hyvinkää.

External links
Finnish Railway Museum
Steam Locomotives in Finland Including the Finnish Railway Museum

Gallery

References

Sk1
Sk1
Railway locomotives introduced in 1885
SLM locomotives
2-6-0 locomotives
5 ft gauge locomotives